The 2017 UMass Minutemen soccer team represented the University of Massachusetts Amherst during the 2017 NCAA Division I men's soccer season. It was the program's 88th season in existence, and their 31st in the Atlantic 10 Conference. The Minutemen were led by fourth-year head coach, Fran O'Leary.

The season proved to be one of the more successful seasons for the Minutemen, as they qualified for the NCAA Division I Men's Soccer Championship for the first time since 2008, and posted their first winning overall record since 2008. The Minutemen won their sixth Atlantic 10 Regular Season championship, and completed the conference double by winning their third ever Atlantic 10 Men's Soccer Tournament. It was the program's first time to win both the regular season and tournament in the same season. At the end of the regular season, UMass was ranked in the United Soccer Coaches poll at 24, making it the first time in a decade the Minutemen earned national rankings.

The Minutemen earned an automatic berth into the NCAA Tournament, where they hosted Colgate. Their spell in the NCAA Tournament was short-lived, as they fell 2–0 to the Raiders at home.

Roster 
Updated November 24, 2017

Schedule 

|-
!colspan=8 style=""| Preseason

|-
!colspan=8 style=""| Non-conference regular season
|-

|-
!colspan=8 style=""| Conference regular season
|-

|-
!colspan=8 style=""| Atlantic 10 Tournament
|-

|-
!colspan=8 style=""| NCAA Tournament
|-

|-

References 

UMass Minutemen soccer seasons
Mass Minutemen
Mass Minutemen
Mass Minutemen, soccer
Mass Minutemen